Catherine Comet (born 1944) is a French-born, American conductor who from 1986 to 1997 was the music director of the Grand Rapids Symphony in Grand Rapids, Michigan, becoming the first woman to hold a post as music director of a professional orchestra in the United States. During her 11-year tenure with the Grand Rapids Symphony, she also served as music director of the American Symphony Orchestra. She received the Seaver/National Endowment for the Arts Conductors Award in 1988.

From 1984 to 1986, Comet was associate conductor of the Baltimore Symphony Orchestra.

References

External links
 
 Interview with Catherine Comet, January 7, 1991

Women conductors (music)
Living people
1944 births
21st-century American conductors (music)
20th-century American conductors (music)
21st-century American women musicians
20th-century American women musicians
French emigrants to the United States